Ciclotizolam (WE-973) is a drug which is a thienotriazolodiazepine derivative. It is a partial agonist for the benzodiazepine site of the GABAA receptor, with similar binding affinity to related compounds like brotizolam, but a low efficacy.

See also
Benzodiazepine

References

Chloroarenes
GABAA receptor positive allosteric modulators
Bromoarenes
Thienotriazolodiazepines
Cyclohexyl compounds